The  is a railway line operated by West Japan Railway Company (JR West) in the mountainous area of the Chūgoku region of Japan. It begins at the south end of Okayama Prefecture at Kurashiki Station in Kurashiki, passing through Niimi Station on the west side of Niimi, and terminating at Hōki-Daisen Station in Yonago, Tottori Prefecture, linking Okayama Prefecture and Yonago across the Chūgoku Mountains. The Hakubi Line follows the Takahashi River between Kurashiki and Niimi, and the Hino River between Shōyama and Hōki-Daisen.

Since 2007, the ICOCA card can be used in all stations between Kurashiki Station and Bitchū-Takahashi Station.

Line data
The Okayama Division of JR West has jurisdictional control over operations between Kurashiki and Niizato stations, with the Yonago Division having control between Kami-Iwami and Hōki-Daisen Station. The boundary is midway between Niizato and Kami-Iwami Stations. The line color for the portion covered by the Okayama Division is vermillion orange, while the section covered by the Yonago Division is the standard blue.

Services

Limited express 

 Yakumo
 Sunrise Izumo

Stations

Rolling stock

 115 series
 213 series
 285 series
 381 series
 KiHa 120
 KiHa 126

The experimental "Smart BEST" battery electric train was tested on the Hakubi Line between October and December 2012.

History
The northern section was then progressively extended south, to Ebi Station on 25 March 1922, to Neu Station on 30 July 1922, to Kurosaka Station on 10 November 1922, to Shōyama Station on 28 November 1923, to Kami-Iwami Station on 6 December 1924, and to Ashidachi Station on 1 December 1926.

The southern section was gradually extended north, extending to Bitchū-Kawamo on 31 July 1927, with connection between the north and south sections being made on 25 October 1928, from which date the entire line was named the Hakubi Line.

The Kiyone to Bitchu-Takahashi section was double-tracked between 1968 and 1973, with the Kurashiki to Kiyone and Niimi to Nunohara sections being double-tracked in 1979, and the Ishiga to Ikuta section double-tracked between 1982 and 1983 in conjunction with a realignment which shortened the route by 1.2 km. CTC signalling was commissioned on the entire line in 1972, and the Kurashiki to Hokidaisen section was electrified in 1982.

Timeline
 10 August 1919: The Hakubi North Line opens between Hōki-Mizoguchi and Hōki-Daisen Stations.
 25 March 1922: The Hakubi North Line opens between Hōki-Mizoguchi and Ebi Stations.
 30 July 1922: The Hakubi North Line opens between Ebi and Neu Stations.
 10 November 1922: The Hakubi North Line opens between Neu and Kurosaka Stations.
 28 November 1923: The Hakubi North Line opens between Kurosaka and Shōyama Stations.
 6 December 1924: The Hakubi North Line opens between Shōyama and Kami-Iwami Stations.
 17 February 1925: The Hakubi South Line opens between Kurashiki and Shisawa Station (now Gōkei Station).
 1 April 1925: The Hakubi North Line opens at Kamisuge Station.
 17 May 1925: The Hakubi South Line opens between Shisawa and Minagi Stations.
 20 June 1926: The Hakubi South Line opens between Minagi and Kinoyama Stations.
 1 December 1926: The Habuki North Line opens between Kami-Iwami and Ashidachi Stations.
 31 July 1927: The Hakubi South Line opens between Kinoyama and Bitchū-Kawamo Stations.
 25 October 1928: Service starts between Bitchū-Kawamo and Ashidachi stations. The line is completed and renamed the Hakubi Line.

See also
List of railway lines in Japan

References

 
Railway lines opened in 1919
Lines of West Japan Railway Company
1067 mm gauge railways in Japan